Boys is a 1990 Soviet drama film directed by  and Renata Grigoryeva. The film is based on the tenth book of the same name, part four of Fyodor Dostoevsky's novel "The Brothers Karamazov".

Plot 
Monk Alyosha Karamazov tries to protect the boy from classmates and finds himself involved in the history of the life of the family of a person who does everything possible to maintain honor and dignity, despite the difficult situation.

Cast 
 Dmitriy Chernigovskiy
 Olga Gobzeva		
 Anastasiya Ivanova
 Evgeniy Tashkov
 Lyudmila Zaytseva

References

External links 
 

1990 films
1990s Russian-language films
Soviet drama films
1990 drama films